Megacraspedus longipalpella is a moth of the family Gelechiidae. It is found in Russia (the southern Ural and Lower Volga). The habitat consists of grassy lowland steppes.

The wingspan is 18–20 mm. The ground colour of the forewings is pale ochreous, sparsely scattered with pale brownish scales. The hindwings are pale fuscous. Adults are on wing from early June to early August.

Etymology
The species name is derived from Latin  longus (meaning long) and palpus (meaning labial palp) and refers to the strongly elongate labial palps.

References

Moths described in 2010
Megacraspedus